Nogaysky District is the name of several administrative and municipal districts in Russia:
Nogaysky District, Republic of Dagestan, an administrative and municipal district of the Republic of Dagestan
Nogaysky District, Karachay–Cherkess Republic, an administrative and municipal district of the Karachay-Cherkess Republic

See also
Nogai (disambiguation)

References